Garneill is an unincorporated community in Fergus County, Montana, United States.

History
A post office was established at Garneill in 1899, and remained in operation until it was discontinued in 1975. Garneill is a conjoin of the names of two early settlers: Garnet and Neill.

See also

References

External links

Unincorporated communities in Fergus County, Montana
Unincorporated communities in Montana